Aparaglossata is a clade of insects comprising all modern holometabolous insects except for Hymenoptera. The clade is named for one of its most recognizable synapomorphies, the absence of paraglossae. The clade is also characterized by a modification of the ovipositor and a reduction in number of Malpighian tubules.

The larval groundplan of Aparaglossata was prognathous, had well-developed stemmata, and an H-shaped tentorium.

Phylogeny

Phylogeny of Aparaglossata

References

Insect taxa
Protostome unranked clades